Eshgaft or Eshgoft may refer to:
 Eshgaft-e Rumeh, Fars Province
 Eshgaft-e Baba Mir, Khuzestan Province
 Eshgaft-e Baraftab, Khuzestan Province
 Eshgaft-e Gav, Khuzestan Province
 Eshgaft-e Jamushi, Khuzestan Province
 Eshgaft-e Kahdun, Khuzestan Province
 Eshgaft-e Khorma, Khuzestan Province
 Eshgaft-e Mamadali Khan, Khuzestan Province
 Eshgaft-e Mona, Khuzestan Province
 Eshgaft-e Tavileh, Khuzestan Province
 Eshgaft-e Zard, Khuzestan Province
 Eshgaft-e Qateri, Kohgiluyeh and Boyer-Ahmad Province
 Eshgaft-e Shiri, Kohgiluyeh and Boyer-Ahmad Province
 Eshgaft-e Siah, Kohgiluyeh and Boyer-Ahmad Province

See also
 Darreh Eshgaft (disambiguation)
 Eshkaft (disambiguation)
 Sar Eshgaft (disambiguation)